Sons of Tucson is an American sitcom starring Tyler Labine, Frank Dolce, Matthew Levy and Benjamin Stockham. It premiered on Fox on March 11, 2010.  The show was announced as a midseason show to air on Sunday nights at 8:30 pm ET/PT in between animated hits, The Simpsons and Family Guy, although it was changed to 9:30 ET/PT, replacing American Dad!.

On April 5, 2010, it was announced that Fox had canceled Sons of Tucson after only four episodes; the remaining nine episodes that were ordered were burned off beginning June 6, and ending on August 1, 2010.

Premise
The series is about the Gunderson brothers. They own a house in Tucson, Arizona, but since their mother left and their father is in prison, they hire Ron (Tyler Labine) to be their father. At first, the boys just need a father in specific situations, but then they find they have to keep Ron around because he is needed to shake off suspicions.

Characters

Main
 Ron Snuffkin (Tyler Labine) is a thirty-something sporting goods employee who is hired by the Gunderson brothers to substitute for their imprisoned father in order to shake away any suspicions from teachers and neighbors, who suspect that the boys are fending for themselves. He is a slacker who is always ready to take the easy way out of situations.
 Gary Gunderson (Frank Dolce) (age 11) is the middle child of the Gunderson brothers and is the one who comes up with the idea to hire Ron as their fake father. Although he is very intellectual, he can get easily stressed by certain situations. His stress causes him to take blood pressure medication and his serious attitude bothers those around him.
 Brandon Gunderson (Matthew Levy) (age 13) is the oldest of the brothers. Of the three brothers, he is most confused about life, but is always ready to speak his mind when something needs to be said. He is considered a free-spirit.
 Robby Gunderson (Benjamin Stockham) (age 8) is the youngest and most troublesome of the brothers. He enjoys junk food and watching television for many hours.

Supporting
 Glenn (Joe Lo Truglio) is Ron's childhood friend. He is very impressionable and is always willing to follow Ron's schemes. He is frequently pushed around by his wife, Angela.
 Angela (Sarayu Rao) is Glenn's wife. She is very bossy (especially towards Glenn) and does not like the fact that her husband is friends with Ron. She is very suspicious of Ron's "fatherly care" for his "sons" and frequently pesters Glenn about wanting to have children.
 Maggie Morales (Natalie Martinez) is Robbie's third grade teacher. She is very serious about her job and sometimes worried about the environment Robbie is being raised in. It is assumed that Ron has a crush on her, after a failed attempt at getting a kiss, unbeknownst to her.
 Mike Proudfoot (Michael Horse) is one of the employees at Ron's job, Sport Space. He is a Native American, who Ron always asks for advice on what a Native American would know about. Their conversations usually consist of Mike denouncing that he knows more about life than what he already knows about his heritage.
 Joker (Edwin H. Bravo, as Edwin Habacon) is one of Ron's friends who is always ready to let him in on his illegal but profitable activities.

Guest stars
Guest stars during the show's run included Allen Alvarado, Alexandra Breckenridge, Jake Busey, Stephanie Courtney, Kurt Fuller, Jamie Gray Hyder, David Lambert, Keegan-Michael Key, Michael Kostroff, Sydney Park, Stefanie Scott, Hailee Steinfeld, Stacey Travis, Andrew Walker, Nikki Ziering, Buddy Handleson and series producer Justin Berfield.

Episodes

Production
The show was produced by 20th Century Fox Television, WalkingBud Productions and J2TV (Justin Berfield's production company).

Executive producer Todd Holland said Tyler Labine is "an actor who is funny" rather than a comedian. Labine needs to know the appropriate emotional response for his character. Frank Dolce, who plays 11-year-old Gary, said Gary is in charge because his 13-year-old brother just does what makes him feel good and goes along with what others want. His 8-year-old brother couldn't be in charge because he is "anti-authority". Co-creator Tommy Dewey said having an 11-year-old in charge was "more interesting".

Recasting
In July 2009, Fox announced they were recasting the two principal roles of Robby and Brandon. Producer Justin Berfield states this was due to scheduling issues. Robby Gunderson was originally played by Davis Cleveland and Brandon Gunderson was originally played by Troy Gentile.

Reception
In its original American broadcast, the pilot episode was viewed by 4.514 million viewers and received an 18-49 Nielsen Rating of 2.1/5 coming fourth in its timeslot and becoming the least viewed show on Fox that night. Sandra Ganzalez of Entertainment Weekly gave the episode a positive review saying "Like I said, there is not much by way of plot, but the individual pieces of the show give it promise. As EW critic Ken Tucker said in his take, if you liked Tyler Labine’s laid-back-dude vibe in Reaper, you'll probably enjoy Sons of Tucson. Labine does a great job at making Snuffkin a lovable buffoon without crossing the line into campy. The pilot also rested on Labine’s ability to portray the undeniably creepy Snuffkin as likable, considering the premise." On Rotten Tomatoes, the series has an aggregate score of 33% based on 6 positive and 12 negative critic reviews. The website’s consensus reads: "Another formulaic and forgettable FOX sitcom, Sons of Tucson fails to bring anything new to the genre or the network."

Broadcast history
The series premiered on March 11, 2010 in Canada on Global at 9:30 pm ET, and on March 14, 2010 in the United States on Fox at 9:30 pm ET.  This schedule remained until its cancellation was announced on April 5, 2010 after only four episodes.  It returned to air its remaining episodes on June 6, 2010, airing Sundays at 7:30 pm ET (then at 7:00 pm ET on June 27, 2010) on Fox, and at 10:30 pm ET on Global.

in pop culture

First on the Family Guy episode "Excellence in Broadcasting", when Stewie Griffin notes, that "Fox sometimes has bad ideas" while a fake ad for Sons of Tucson appears on screen. He then points at the ad and goes on saying: "Let's all just sit here and remember that this was a thing."
Then on the American Dad! episode "Jenny Fromdabloc", in which Roger reads an advertisement printed on a promotional stress ball, and says: " 'Sons of Tucson – New on Fox'? When was THIS on? I watch Fox all the time; I never saw this!"

References

External links
 
 Sons of Tucson at FX Portugal

2010s American single-camera sitcoms
2010 American television series debuts
2010 American television series endings
Culture of Tucson, Arizona
English-language television shows
Fox Broadcasting Company original programming
Television series by 20th Century Fox Television
Television shows set in Tucson, Arizona
Television series about brothers